Livegasm! is the third live album by the Danish power rock band Dizzy Mizz Lizzy, released on 29 November 2017 in Japan, and on 8 December 2017 in Denmark on double vinyl and as digital album on Columbia Records. It instantly became the best sold vinyl record in Denmark in 2017.

The songs are a compilation of recordings from three festival shows by the band in the summer of 2016, with the tracks predominantly originating from their show at the Roskilde Festival in Roskilde (Denmark). Additional tracks were recorded at Tinderbox in Odense, Denmark and Målrock in Årdal, Norway. It includes songs that have not been recorded live before.

The album title is derived from the song Mindgasm on the band's 2016 album Forward in Reverse.

Track listing 
All tracks written by Tim Christensen and arranged by Dizzy Mizz Lizzy.

 Record one

 Record two

Critical reception 

Thomas Treo of Ekstra Bladet says that "the rock band's newfound format is firmly cemented with the concert recording Livegasm!", which "appears to sounds almost unreal" and on which the new songs impress the most.

Jan Opstrup Poulsen of Danish music magazine GAFFA calls Livegasm! "an excellent documentation of a band that has regained energy and can also play on new strings", on which "it is a bit unexpected that the new songs are the strongest", but "that the audience's singing along and cheering is fully mixed into the soundtrack [which] somewhat ruins the pleasure".

Personnel 

Dizzy Mizz Lizzy
 Tim Christensen – guitar, vocals, songwriting
 Martin Nielsen – bass
 Søren Friis – drums

Post-production
 Rune Nissen-Petersen – editor (at SortHus Recording Facility, Copenhagen, Denmark)
 Tomas Johansson – mastering (at The Panic Room, Skövde, Sweden)
 Jacob Hansen – mixing (at Hansen Studios, Ribe, Denmark)

Live crew
 Paul Hammann – FOH engineer
 Daniel Devantier – monitor engineer, recording engineer
 Kasper Lange – lighting design
 Robert Roos – production management
 Arild Nordgaard – guitar technician
 Vagn Olsen – technician
 Mif Damgaard – tour manager, production management

Additional crew
 Vibeke Nørskov (Nutwood Nest) – cover art designer
 Michael Boe Laigard – photography
 Henrik Seifert – booking, management

Charts

References 

2017 live albums
Dizzy Mizz Lizzy albums
Sony Music Denmark albums